Dan DePalma (born July 21, 1989) is a former American football wide receiver who signed with the New York Jets as an undrafted free agent in 2011. He also played for the New York Giants, San Diego Chargers, and Saskatchewan Roughriders. He played college football at West Chester University. DePalma played high school football at Verona High School in Verona, New Jersey. DePalma is married to college sweetheart, Megan (Dychala) DePalma.

Professional career

New York Jets
On July 27, 2011, DePalma was signed by the New York Jets as an undrafted free agent. He was released on September 3, 2011.

New York Giants
On September 7, 2011, DePalma signed to the New York Giants' practice squad. He re-signed with the Giants on February 8, 2012 and was waived on August 31. DePalma re-signed to the Giants’ practice squad on November 22, 2012.

San Diego Chargers
On April 8, 2013, DePalma was signed by the San Diego Chargers. On August 27, 2013, he was placed on the reserve/injured list. On August 31, 2013, he was waived with an injury settlement. On November 26, 2013, DePalma was signed to the Chargers' practice squad.

Saskatchewan Roughriders
DePalma signed with the Saskatchewan Roughriders in June 2014.  He was released on June 21, 2014

References

External links 
 New York Giants Profile
 NFL Profile
 San Diego Chargers bio
Saskatchewan Roughriders bio 
 West Chester University Bio
 Who is Dan DePalma? Only the Giants’ secret weapon in practice

1989 births
Living people
People from Verona, New Jersey
Verona High School (New Jersey) alumni
Players of American football from New Jersey
American football wide receivers
West Chester Golden Rams football players
Sportspeople from Essex County, New Jersey
New York Jets players
New York Giants players
San Diego Chargers players